Mario Scavello (born May 9, 1952) is a Republican member of the Pennsylvania State Senate representing the 40th district. Prior to his election to the State Senate in 2014, he served as a member of the Pennsylvania House of Representatives representing the 176th Legislative District of Pennsylvania.  He has been a member of the House Appropriations, Ethics, Finance, Professional Licensure, and Tourism and Recreational Development Committees.

Career
Prior to his election to the State House, Scavello was the mayor of Mount Pocono, Pennsylvania and former chairman of the Monroe County Board of Commissioners.

Scavello was first elected in a special election held April 23, 2002 to replace Chris Wogan, who was elected to serve on the Philadelphia Court of Common Pleas.  The combination of Wogan's resignation and statewide redistricting eliminated the Philadelphia district and triggered a special election for the new district in Monroe County.  Scavello defeated a former representative, Democrat Joseph Battisto with over 60% of the vote to take the seat.  He was elected to a full term in November, 2002, and served six full terms in the House until he decided to run for the newly created 40th Senate District, which was moved from Allegheny County to Monroe and Northampton counties.

Scavello ran for and was elected to the Pennsylvania State Senate in the 2014 election. Scavello defeated Democrat Mark Aurand. On November 6, 2018, Scavello won his re-election bid against Democrat Tarah Probst.

Committee assignments 

 Transportation, Vice Chair
 Aging & Youth
 Consumer Protection & Professional Licensure 
 Rules & Executive Nominations 
 Urban Affairs & Housing

Personal
Scavello is a graduate of Theodore Roosevelt High School in the Bronx, New York and attended the City University of New York.

He lives in Mount Pocono with his wife Mary Ann, and has two grown daughters.

References

External links
Representative Mario Scavello's official web site
Pennsylvania Senate Biography

1952 births
Living people
Republican Party members of the Pennsylvania House of Representatives
People from Monroe County, Pennsylvania
People from the Bronx
Mayors of places in Pennsylvania
21st-century American politicians